Dora Castanheira (born 14 March 1960) is a Brazilian volleyball player. She competed at the 1980 Summer Olympics and the 1988 Summer Olympics.

References

External links
 

1960 births
Living people
Brazilian women's volleyball players
Olympic volleyball players of Brazil
Volleyball players at the 1980 Summer Olympics
Volleyball players at the 1988 Summer Olympics
Sportspeople from Minas Gerais
Pan American Games medalists in volleyball
Pan American Games bronze medalists for Brazil
Medalists at the 1979 Pan American Games
20th-century Brazilian women